Idriss ibn al-Hassan al-Alami (1925–2007) (إدريس بن الحسن العلمي) was a Moroccan poet and translator. He is also the author of several books on the Arab language. Among the books he translated into Arabic are La Peur by Guy de Maupassant and La solidarité par la Science by Eugène Diderot.

Works
Five collections of poetry:
 Sur le chemin de la liberté.
 Avec Dieu ALLAH.
 Avec les fleurs de la vie.
 Le bonheur.
 Sur la voie.
Books on language and translation:
 À propos de l'Arabisation.
 À propos de la langue arabe.
 À propos de la terminologie.
 Comparaison entre la langue arabe et la langue française.
Translations:
 from Arabic into French : 
 ...et j'ai adopté l'Islam - by Emilie Bramlet. 
 le Sex-appel - by Nimat Sidequi
 Le Prophète de l'Islam à trvers sa tradition: le Livre de la Foi.
 from French into Arabic: 
 l'Islam et la culture médicale - by Amal Alami.
 La Peur - by Guy de Maupassant.
 La solidarité par la Science - by Eugène Diderot.
To be published:
 La traversée (autobiography).
 Guide de la poésie arabe.
 La Science de la terminologie.

External links
On the author Site Officiel de Idriss ben Al Hassan Al Alami
Arabic Academy Académie de la langue arabe
Islam-Maroc Islam-Maroc

Moroccan autobiographers
Moroccan translators
20th-century Moroccan poets
1925 births
2007 deaths
20th-century translators
French–Arabic translators
21st-century Moroccan poets